Stanbridge may refer to:

Places
Stanbridge, Bedfordshire
Stanbridge, Dorset
Stanbridge, Quebec (disambiguation)
Stanbridge, New South Wales

People with the surname
Aleah Stanbridge (1976–2016), South African singer-songwriter